Heather Clarke (born 25 July 1958) is a Canadian rower. She competed in the women's coxed four event at the 1988 Summer Olympics.

References

External links
 

1958 births
Living people
Canadian female rowers
Olympic rowers of Canada
Rowers at the 1988 Summer Olympics
People from Whitchurch-Stouffville
Commonwealth Games medallists in rowing
Commonwealth Games silver medallists for Canada
Rowers at the 1986 Commonwealth Games
20th-century Canadian women
Medallists at the 1986 Commonwealth Games